The Pembina River is a river in the Unorganized Part of Kenora District in Northwestern Ontario, Canada. The river is part of the James Bay drainage basin, and flows from Pembina Lake to Pembina Bay on the north shore of Lake St. Joseph. The latter lake is the source of the Albany River, which flows to James Bay.

References

Sources

Rivers of Kenora District